Jan-Moritz Lichte (born 12 January 1980) is a German football manager, who works as assistant coach for Turkey. As a player, he played for KSV Baunatal. He was an assistant manager at Mainz 05 between 2017 and 2020.

Playing career
Lichte began his playing career in the youth teams of KSV Baunatal, before transferring to their first team in 1998. Across nine seasons, the midfielder appeared 258 times in the fifth-tier Oberliga Hessen. During the 2007–08 season, Lichte played for the reserve side of SC Paderborn. In April 2009, he retired at the age of 29.

Managerial career
Lichte passed his coaching course in 2009 as the best on the course. He had taken the course at the Hennes-Weisweiler-Academy alongside Sascha Lewandowski, amongst others.

Lichte was assistant manager at Bundesliga side Bayer Leverkusen from 2012 until 2014. For the 2014–15 season, he switched to Hannover 96 as assistant manager and was responsible for the youth teams at the club the following season.

From the 2017–18 season, Lichte was assistant manager of Mainz 05. On the seventh matchday of the 2019–20 Bundesliga, he was responsible for managing the side against SC Paderborn due to a red card shown to manager Sandro Schwarz in their previous match. He became head coach of the club in September 2020 on a temporary basis after they parted company with manager Achim Beierlorzer. He was sacked on 28 December 2020. His final match was a DFB-Pokal against VfL Bochum on 23 December 2020 where Mainz lost in a shootout. He finished with a record of one win, four draws, and seven losses.

Personal life
In 2008, Lichte graduated from Paderborn University with a degree in sports science. His younger brother Henning played for the reserve team of Mainz 05 in the 2004–05 Regionalliga Süd.

Managerial record

References

External links

Jan-Moritz Lichte at the archive of KSV Baunatal

1980 births
Living people
Sportspeople from Kassel
German footballers
Association football midfielders
SC Paderborn 07 II players
Hannover 96 non-playing staff
FC St. Pauli non-playing staff
German football managers
Bayer 04 Leverkusen non-playing staff
1. FSV Mainz 05 non-playing staff
1. FSV Mainz 05 managers
Bundesliga managers
Footballers from Hesse